Ercheia diversipennis is a species of moth of the family Erebidae first described by Francis Walker in 1858. It is found in Sri Lanka, India, Myanmar, Indonesia and Malaysia.

References

Moths described in 1858
Ercheiini